Barnacle Valley is an ice-free valley  west-southwest of Dotson Ridge in the Convoy Range of Victoria Land. The name is one of a group of nautical names in the Convoy Range, this one applied by the 1989–90 New Zealand Antarctic Research Program field party with reference to the low and blocky floor of this valley, which has unusually large ice wedge polygon hummocks.

References
 

Valleys of Victoria Land
Scott Coast